White Souls in Black Suits is the debut studio album of Clock DVA, released in December 1980 by Industrial Records. It was originally issued only as a cassette, though it was reissued on vinyl (Italy only) and CD.

Track listing

Personnel 
Adapted from the White Souls in Black Suits liner notes.

Clock DVA
 Charlie Collins – soprano saxophone, alto saxophone, baritone saxophone, sopranino saxophone, flute, percussion, bells
 David James Hammond – guitar
 Roger Quail – percussion
 Adi Newton – vocals, synthesizer, clarinet, bowed guitar
 Steven James Turner – bass guitar

Production and additional personnel
 Richard H. Kirk – mixing (4)
 Stephen Mallinder – mixing (B4)
 Jon Mills – engineering
 Chris Watson – mixing (B4)

Release history

References

External links 
 

1980 debut albums
Clock DVA albums
Industrial Records albums